Allonby is a civil parish in the Borough of Allerdale in Cumbria, England.  It contains 13 listed buildings that are recorded in the National Heritage List for England.  All the listed buildings are designated at Grade II, the lowest of the three grades, which is applied to "buildings of national importance and special interest".  The parish contains the coastal village of Allonby and the surrounding countryside.  All but one of the listed buildings, a farmhouse, are within the village.  They include houses, cottages, a Quaker meeting house, almshouses, a church and Sunday school, a hotel, and a milestone.


Buildings

References

Citations

Sources

Lists of listed buildings in Cumbria